Libertina Inaviposa Amathila (née Appolus, born 10 December 1940) is a Namibian physician and politician. She was the deputy Prime Minister of Namibia from 2005 to 2010.

Early life
Amathila was born in Fransfontein, Kunene Region. Under the SWAPO Nationhood Programme, she received a scholarship to study medicine in Poland and graduated from the Warsaw Medical Academy in 1969, becoming Namibia's first female doctor. She later worked in SWAPO refugee camps.

Political career
At SWAPO's 1969 consultative congress in exile in Tanzania, Amathila became deputy secretary for health and welfare on the SWAPO central committee and director of the SWAPO Women's Council.  Immediately prior to independence, she was a SWAPO member of the Constituent Assembly, which was in place from November 1989 to March 1990, and since independence in March 1990 she has been a member of the National Assembly of Namibia. She was Minister of Regional and Local Government and Housing from March 21, 1990 to September 12, 1996, at which point she became Minister of Health and Social Services, serving in that position until becoming deputy Prime Minister on March 21, 2005.

In September 1999, she was elected for a one-year term as chairperson of the World Health Organization's Regional Committee for Africa, and on May 15, 2000 she elected as the president of the 53rd Session of the World Health Assembly. She received the tenth highest number of votes—363—in the election to the central committee of SWAPO at the party's August 2002 congress.

She retired from politics on the 20th anniversary of Namibia's independence, on 21 March 2010.

Awards and recognition
Amathila received the Ongulumbashe Medal for Bravery and Long Service in 1987, and she was the 1991 recipient of the Nansen Refugee Award. 

In 2002 she named the street Brückenstrasse in Swakopmund after herself.

Personal life
Amathila is married to fellow politician Ben Amathila.

References

1940 births
Living people
People from Kunene Region
SWAPO politicians
Urban and rural development ministers of Namibia
Health and social services ministers of Namibia
Members of the National Assembly (Namibia)
Women members of the National Assembly (Namibia)
21st-century Namibian women politicians
21st-century Namibian politicians
20th-century Namibian women politicians
20th-century Namibian politicians
Women government ministers of Namibia
Nansen Refugee Award laureates